Mohammed Sani Idriss is a Nigerian academic and politician from Yobe State, Nigeria. He is currently the Commissioner of Education of the Yobe State Ministry of Basic and Secondary Education after his appointment by Mai Mala Buni, the governor of Yobe State.

References

People from Yobe State
Year of birth missing (living people)
Living people
Nigerian politicians